Piquerism (from the French piquer - "to prick") is a sexual interest in penetrating the skin of another person with sharp objects (such as pins, razors, knives, etc.). Sometimes, this is serious enough to cause extreme injuries or even death.  Piquerism is a paraphilia as well as a form of sadism. The most frequently targeted areas of the body are the breasts, buttocks, and groin.

Examples

Andrei Chikatilo
Soviet serial killer Andrei Chikatilo was impotent and could only achieve sexual arousal through stabbing and cutting people with a knife.

Jack the Ripper
Dr. Robert D. Keppel and his colleagues concluded in an analysis of London's Jack the Ripper murders of 1888 that "the injuries sustained by the victims displayed the signature characteristic of picquerism."

Albert Fish

American serial killer Albert Fish has been said to have engaged in piquerism upon his victims and his own body, flagellating himself constantly with a nail-studded board. After his arrest and subsequent jailing for the murder of Grace Budd, an X-ray revealed at least 29 needles that were inserted into his groin and pelvic region.

Frank Ranieri 
A 25-year old American was arrested in June 2007 for bribing multiple young females with large sums of money in exchange for poking their buttocks with sharp objects.

Elaine O'Hara 
Elaine O'Hara was murdered in 2012 by a man, architect Graham Dwyer, whose sexual behaviour matches piquerism.

See also
London Monster
 "Pique", an episode of Law & Order: Special Victims Unit with piquerism as a main plot element

Footnotes

BDSM terminology
Paraphilias